Alassane N'Diaye (born 25 February 1990) is a French footballer who plays as a midfielder for Khaitan SC.

Career
After developing his game at Sochaux in his native France and FC Alle in Switzerland, N'Diaye moved to English Championship side Crystal Palace to play first-team football.

He made his debut in August 2009, and scored his first goal for the Eagles in a win at West Bromwich Albion, before scoring again in a home win over Blackpool. However, N'Diaye's first-team appearances decreased over the course of the 2009–10 season, and they were even fewer and far between the following year. He finished the 2010–11 season on loan at Swindon Town, suffering relegation from League One, before moving to League Two side Southend United on a season-long loan in the 2011–12 season. However, this loan was cancelled after a bust-up with a teammate, and his contract at Palace was also cancelled 10 months early at this time.

In November 2011, N'Diaye signed a short-term contract with Barnet. However, he did not earn a regular first team place, appearing mainly as an unused substitute. In May 2012, N'Diaye was released by Barnet on the expiry of his contract.

In October 2012, he signed for Conference South side Hayes & Yeading United. Upon the move, N'Diaye says he wants his career to appear back on track after a frustrating first three years in English football. After making 27 appearances and scoring seven times, he was released in March 2013, ending rumours of his departure becoming more imminent. Following his released, N'Diaye was linked with Portsmouth.

In March 2013, he signed for Hastings United; scoring the winner in the local derby against Lewes on his debut. At the end of the season, with the club relegated, N'Diaye scored on his last appearance, in a 1-0 win over Kingstonian before leaving the club.

Soon after leaving Hastings United, N'Diaye joined Lokomotiv Plovdiv in the Bulgarian A Professional Football Group. He left the club at the end of the season but stayed in Bulgaria, signing for Beroe Stara Zagora. In June 2015, he moved to Kazakhstan to sign for Irtysh Pavlodar, scoring on his debut against Okzhetpes in a 1-0 win.

In December 2015, N'Diaye moved to fellow Kazakhstan Premier League side FC Tobol.

In September 2017, N'Diaye signed for a Ukrainian club FC Chornomorets Odessa.

In February 2018, N'Diaye signed for a Lithuanian A Lyga champion club Sūduva. He left the club at the end of 2018. He then returned to France to join FC Grandvillars in the summer 2019.

Career statistics

References

External links

1990 births
Living people
People from Audincourt
French sportspeople of Senegalese descent
Association football midfielders
French footballers
Sportspeople from Doubs
Footballers from Bourgogne-Franche-Comté
Crystal Palace F.C. players
Swindon Town F.C. players
Southend United F.C. players
Barnet F.C. players
Hayes & Yeading United F.C. players
Hastings United F.C. players
PFC Lokomotiv Plovdiv players
PFC Beroe Stara Zagora players
FC Irtysh Pavlodar players
FC Tobol players
ASM Belfort players
FC Chornomorets Odesa players
FC Botev Vratsa players
English Football League players
National League (English football) players
Isthmian League players
First Professional Football League (Bulgaria) players
Kazakhstan Premier League players
Ukrainian Premier League players
A Lyga players
French expatriate footballers
Expatriate footballers in England
Expatriate footballers in Bulgaria
Expatriate footballers in Kazakhstan
Expatriate footballers in Ukraine
Expatriate footballers in Lithuania
French expatriate sportspeople in England
French expatriate sportspeople in Bulgaria
French expatriate sportspeople in Ukraine
French expatriate sportspeople in Kazakhstan
French expatriate sportspeople in Lithuania